American Utopia is a 2020 American concert film directed and produced by Spike Lee, from a screenplay by David Byrne. The film is a live recording of a Broadway performance of the show adapted from the touring show that supported the album of the same name. The film features selections from that album, as well as songs from throughout Byrne's career. Byrne performed alongside eleven musicians, all of whom used wireless or portable equipment. Frequent collaborator Annie-B Parson served as choreographer.

It had its world premiere at the 2020 Toronto International Film Festival on September 10, 2020. The film received critical acclaim.

Cast
All provide percussion; all except Byrne provide backing vocals.
David Byrne – lead vocals, occasional guitar
 Chris Giarmo – dancing, melodica
 Tendayi Kuumba – dancing
 Karl Mansfield – keyboards, musical director
 Angie Swan – electric guitar
 Bobby Wooten III – bass
 Mauro Refosco – drums, musical director
 Tim Keiper – drums
 Gustavo Di Dalva
 Jacquelene Acevedo – drums
 Daniel Freedman – drums
 Stephane San Juan – drums

Songs
"Here" (from American Utopia)
"I Know Sometimes a Man Is Wrong" (from Rei Momo)
"Don't Worry About the Government" (from Talking Heads: 77)
"Lazy" (from Muzikizum by X-Press 2)
"This Must Be the Place (Naive Melody)" (from Speaking in Tongues)
"I Zimbra" (from Fear of Music)
"Slippery People" (from Speaking in Tongues)
"I Should Watch TV" (from Love This Giant)
"Everybody's Coming to My House" (from American Utopia)
"Once in a Lifetime" (from Remain in Light)
"Glass, Concrete & Stone" (from Grown Backwards)
"Toe Jam" (from I Think We're Gonna Need a Bigger Boat by The Brighton Port Authority)
"Born Under Punches (The Heat Goes On)" (from Remain in Light)
"I Dance Like This" (from American Utopia)
"Bullet" (from American Utopia)
"Every Day Is a Miracle" (from American Utopia)
"Blind" (from Naked)
"Burning Down the House" (from Speaking in Tongues)
"Hell You Talmbout" (from The Electric Lady by Janelle Monáe)
"One Fine Day" (from Everything That Happens Will Happen Today)
"Road to Nowhere" (from Little Creatures)
"Everybody's Coming to My House: Detroit" (End Credits)

Production
In June 2020, it was announced Spike Lee had directed a filmed version of the Broadway performance American Utopia by David Byrne, with HBO distributing.

Release
The film had its world premiere at the Toronto International Film Festival on September 10, 2020. It screened at the New York Film Festival on October 3, 2020, and the BFI London Film Festival on October 14, 2020. It was broadcast in the United States and Canada on HBO and made available for streaming through HBO Max (U.S.) and Crave (Canada) on October 17, 2020. Universal Pictures distributes the film in all other countries. The film received a limited theatrical release in the United States throughout September 2021.

Reception
American Utopia received critical acclaim. The site's critical consensus reads, "Helmed in elegant and exhilarating style by Spike Lee, David Byrne's American Utopia is a concert film that doubles as a joyously cathartic celebration." On Metacritic, the film holds a rating of 93 out of 100, based on 28 critics, indicating "universal acclaim".

Erik Adams of The A.V. Club devotes a lengthy review to American Utopia as "the right movie for 2020", noting how Byrne balances hope in a tumultuous world, writing, "The key to American Utopias resonance isn’t so much one of joy versus despair as it is connection versus isolation".

Accolades

References

External links
 

2020 films
American documentary films
American rock music films
Concert films
Films set in a theatre
Documentary films about Broadway theatre
Films directed by Spike Lee
Participant (company) films
HBO Films films
Universal Pictures films
Special Tony Award recipients
40 Acres and a Mule Filmworks films
2020s English-language films
2020s American films